Once Upon a Christmas was recorded during the Mormon Tabernacle Choir's 2011 Christmas shows in the LDS Conference Center with special guests Jane Seymour and Nathan Gunn.  The album was released on September 4, 2012 along with a concert DVD.  A book titled Good King Wenceslas illustrated by Omar Rayyan and accompanying DVD featuring Jane Seymour introducing and narrating the story also released in conjunction with the album release.  The recorded concert was broadcast on PBS during December 2012 to more than 4 million Americans.

Track listing

Charts

References

Tabernacle Choir albums
2012 Christmas albums
Christmas albums by American artists